The Unified Model is a numerical weather prediction and climate modeling software suite originally developed by the United Kingdom Met Office, and now both used and further developed by many weather-forecasting agencies around the world. The Unified Model gets its name because a single model is used across a range of both timescales (nowcasting to centennial) and spatial scales (convective scale to climate system earth modelling). The models are grid-point based, rather than wave based, and are run on a variety of supercomputers around the world. The Unified Model atmosphere can be coupled to a number of ocean models. At the Met Office it is used for the main suite of Global Model, North Atlantic and Europe model (NAE) and a high-resolution UK model (UKV), in addition to a variety of Crisis Area Models and other models that can be run on demand. Similar Unified Model suites with global and regional domains are used by many other national or military weather agencies around the world for operational forecasting.

Data for numerical weather prediction is provided by observations from satellites, from the ground (both human and from automatic weather stations), from buoys at sea, radar, radiosonde weather balloons, wind profilers, commercial aircraft and a background field from previous model runs. 
The computer model is only adjusted towards the observations using assimilation, rather than forcing the model to accept an observed value that might make the system unstable (and could be an inaccurate observation).
The Unified Model software suite is written in Fortran (originally 77 but now predominantly 90) and uses height as the vertical variable.
Because most developments of interest are near to the ground the vertical layers are closer together near the surface.

Principal UM suites at the Met Office
The Met Office runs a range of Numerical Weather Prediction suites using the UM.

All of the models use varying resolutions of topography with greater accuracy at higher resolutions. The limiting factor with all models is that for a weather event to be recorded by the model it must be at least three grid points in size. Thus for the global model at 40 km, a weather system must be at least 120 km to be modelled. This means smaller phenomena such as small depressions, smaller hurricanes and large thunderstorms are too small for the model to catch them. As the resolution increases smaller events can be caught, the 1.5 km model for example, is reputedly capable of modelling individual showers.

Global Model
Approximately 16 km resolution with 70 vertical levels. Covers the entire globe and 168 hours in the future twice a day, the shortest outlook of the synoptic scale models currently in use (most others run out at least 10 days; furthermore, the Unified Model forecasts are only available out 72 hours for non-paying users). The Global model provides boundary information for the now retired North Atlantic European (NAE) model, for which additional shorter runs (48 hours) are produced twice a day. The model is kept close to the real atmosphere using hybrid 4D-Var data assimilation of observations.

North Atlantic and European model - Retired
The Met Office's North Atlantic and European model (NAE) model had 70 levels with a 12 km resolution. It is run out to 48 hours from start. Because the UK is at a northern latitude the computer transposes the model area to an equatorial location so the grid points give an area that is more square. This reduces the load on the model, allowing it to run more quickly. The model is kept close to the real atmosphere using 4D-Var data assimilation of observations.

Euro 4km model
70 Vertical levels, 4.4 km horizontal resolution. Run out to 120 hours. Now being superseded by the UKV in many applications.

UKV model
70 Vertical levels, 1.5 km horizontal resolution. Run out to 36 hours (this replaced the UK 4 km model in 2011). The forecast is run every 3 hours using boundary conditions from the 25-km global model. The resolution is 1.5 km over the UK, and 4 km over surrounding areas. The UKV model is kept close to observations using 3D-Var data assimilation every 3 hours.

CAM
The Crisis Area Model is a 12 km model that can be run for any area of the world should the need arise. This can include military use (the MMU use this on deployed operations) or environmental catastrophes.

Mountain Wave Models
This high resolution model provides information on mountain waves for a variety of locations around the UK and other areas of interest to the Met Office.

Met Office's Global Wave Model
This models sea waves around the world.

UM suites outside the Met Office

Unified Model suites which are similar to those from the Met Office are run by the Australian Bureau of Meteorology, the Australian Commonwealth Scientific and Industrial Research Organisation, the South African Weather Service, the Norwegian Meteorological Institute, the New Zealand National Institute of Water and Atmospheric Research, the [South] Korea Meteorological Administration and the National Centre for Medium Range Weather Forecasting, a subordinate office of the Indian Ministry of Earth Sciences.

Australian Bureau of Meteorology

The Australian Bureau of Meteorology, have an operational 12 km resolution global forecasting system utilizing the Unified Model. This global system provides boundary conditions for a number of higher resolution regional systems also using the Unified Model.

[South] Korea Meteorological Administration

The [South] Korea Meteorological Administration have an operational 10 km resolution global forecasting system utilizing the Unified Model. This global system provides boundary conditions for a 1.5 km resolution local Unified Model NWP system covering the Korean Peninsula Region.

UKCA
United Kingdom Chemistry & Aerosols (UKCA) is a sub-model of the UM that deals with trace gas and aerosol chemistry within the model. This includes calculating the concentrations of climatically relevant gases such as methane and ozone, as well as the composition and evolution of aerosols. As with most of the UM, the UKCA was written in a collaboration between the UK Met Office and UK Academia.

JULES
Joint UK Land Environment System is a land surface model that has been developed in a collaboration between the Met Office and other research institutes. JULES models the exchange of heat and moisture between the Unified Model atmosphere and the land surface and vegetation. JULES can also be used offline to estimate the impacts of different climate models on the land surface and hydrology.

References

External links
 Unified Model Collaboration webpage at the Met Office.
 Unified Model Papers
 Introduction to the UM by NCAS

Numerical climate and weather models
Met Office
Scientific simulation software